Jhok or Jhok Shareef is a small town in district Sujawal, Sindh, Pakistan.

Battle of Jhok
Jhok is also the home of Sufi Shah Inayat Shaheed, who battled against the Mughal empire over the distribution of land  and taxation among poor peasants (Harees) and thus was executed at the hands of Farrukhsiyar, then ruler of India.

See also
Shah Inayat Shaheed

External links
 Sufi Shah Inayat Shaheed

Populated places in Sujawal District